I Am Pilgrim is the debut novel by former journalist and screenwriter, Terry Hayes. It was published on 18 July 2013 in the United Kingdom.

Synopsis
"Pilgrim" is an American former intelligence agent known as the "Rider of the Blue" who later writes a book on forensic pathology. Pilgrim becomes involved in a case in New York City where a mysterious woman uses his book to commit untraceable murders in the aftermath of 9/11. The "Saracen" is a Saudi who becomes radicalised by watching his father's beheading. He later trains as a doctor and fights in the Soviet–Afghan War. Pilgrim is recalled to the intelligence community who have detected a threat involving the Saracen, who has created a vaccine-resistant strain of the variola major virus.

Awards and honours
2014 Specsavers National Book Awards "Thriller & Crime Novel of the Year"

Film adaptation
In July 2014, MGM bought the movie rights for the book and are set to target a series of films, similar to the Bond franchise, with Matthew Vaughn directing. In April 2018, James Gray was set to direct.

References

External links
 I Am Pilgrim Facebook page

2013 British novels
British spy novels
British thriller novels
2013 debut novels
Corgi books